Notices of the American Mathematical Society is the membership journal of the American Mathematical Society (AMS), published monthly except for the combined June/July issue. The first volume appeared in 1953.  Each issue of the magazine since January 1995 is available in its entirety on the journal web site. Articles are peer-reviewed by an editorial board of mathematical experts. Since 2019, the editor-in-chief is Erica Flapan. The cover regularly features mathematical visualizations.

The Notices is self-described to be the world's most widely read mathematical journal. As the membership journal of the American Mathematical Society, the Notices is sent to the approximately 30,000 AMS members worldwide, one-third of whom reside outside the United States. By publishing high-level exposition, the Notices provides opportunities for mathematicians to find out what is going on in the field. Each issue contains one or two such expository articles that describe current developments in mathematical research, written by professional mathematicians. The Notices also carries articles on the history of mathematics, mathematics education, and professional issues facing mathematicians, as well as reviews of books and other works.

See also
American Mathematical Monthly, another "most widely read mathematics journal in the world"

References

External links

 

American Mathematical Society academic journals
Mathematics journals
English-language journals
Monthly journals
Publications established in 1953
Mathematics magazines